Kenneth Bagshaw (23 October 1920 – 8 October 1985) was an Australian cricketer. He played four first-class matches for South Australia between 1946 and 1948.

See also
 List of South Australian representative cricketers

References

External links
 

1920 births
1985 deaths
Australian cricketers
South Australia cricketers